Thomas Leigh, 1st Baron Leigh (1595 – 22 February 1672) was an English politician who sat in the House of Commons from 1628 to 1629. He supported the Royalist cause in the English Civil War and was created a baron in 1643.

Leigh was the son of Sir John Leigh and his first wife Ursula Hoddesdon, daughter of Sir Christopher Hoddesdon, of Leighton Buzzard, Bedfordshire. He matriculated at Magdalen College, Oxford, under entry dated 4 November 1608, aged 13. He succeeded to the baronetcy on the death of his grandfather, Sir Thomas Leigh, 1st Baronet, of Stoneleigh, Warwickshire on 1 February 1626. In 1628, he was elected member of parliament for Warwickshire and sat until 1629 when King Charles decided to rule without parliament for eleven years. He was Sheriff of Warwickshire from 1636 to 1637.

During the Civil War, Leigh showed intrepid loyalty to the king whom he entertained at Stoneleigh when the gates of Coventry were shut against him. He was created Baron Leigh of Stoneleigh on 1 July 1643.

Leigh died at the age of about 77.

Leigh married in about 1615 Mary Egerton, daughter of Sir Thomas Egerton, who was the son of Thomas Egerton, 1st Viscount Brackley, and his wife Elizabeth Venables. Leigh and Mary had at least seven children, five sons and two daughters. Thomas, the eldest son, predeceased his father, and the title passed to the eldest grandson, also named Thomas.

References

1595 births
1672 deaths
Cavaliers
English MPs 1628–1629
1
Alumni of Magdalen College, Oxford
High Sheriffs of Warwickshire
Sheriffs of Warwickshire
People from Warwick District